The 2019 Argentine Republic motorcycle Grand Prix was the second round of the 2019 MotoGP season. It was held at the Autódromo Termas de Río Hondo in Santiago del Estero on 31 March 2019.

Classification

MotoGP

Moto2

 Xavi Vierge's bike experienced an electrical failure on the warm-up lap.
 Augusto Fernández suffered a broken wrist in a crash during practice and withdrew from the event.

Moto3

 Sergio García was declared unfit to start the race following a collision with Jaume Masiá during Sunday morning warm-up session.

Championship standings after the race

MotoGP

Moto2

Moto3

Notes

References

External links

Argentine
Motorcycle Grand Prix
Argentine Republic motorcycle Grand Prix
Argentine Republic motorcycle Grand Prix